Millungera Station is a pastoral lease that operates as a cattle station in Queensland, Australia.

Description

The station occupies an area of approximately one million acres, and is the primary breeding ground for the Acton Land and Cattle Company, which is able to stock 40,000 head of cattle. The property has at least one outstation, Crowfels, which has a Santa Gertrudis stud. The station is situated in the Queensland Gulf country a generally flat tropical savannah with plains of mitchell grass. The property has some frontage along the Flinders River and is close to the Saxby River.

History
The station was established in 1864 along with nearby Taldora Station by the pioneer James Gibson in 1864. Gibson had also established the first property along the Flinders River, Prairie, in 1861.

In 1880 the property was still owned by James Gibson and Company. The Melbourne Queensland Pastoral Company was set up with capital of £120,000 to purchase both Millungera and Taldora Station which had a combined area of 937,600 acres along with 20,000 head of cattle for £80,000 leaving plenty of capital left for further development, the property had been inspected by William Meredith who was to manage the station.

Meredith died in 1881 with his share of the station and stock being passed onto Salome Meredith of Brisbane.

In 1886 Millungera was owned by Meredith, Menzies and C. and the property was being managed by Mr Nutting. The homestead had been built by this stage and was described by a visitor as "the home station house a good one, built at great expense with a 12 foot verandah all around, good kitchen and stores and outbuildings with a permanent hole of water close by". Meredth's grave was also located just a short distance from the homestead.

Large tracts of grazing country at the station were burnt out by bushfires later the same year, other properties surrounding Millungera were similarly affected.

The herds at Millungera and surrounding properties affected by the condition known as pegleg in 1929. This condition is a phosphate deficiency and it was recommended that the cattle were provided with Nauru phosphate salts.

The station was put up for auction along with all the plant, improvements and 24,800 head of cattle in 1930. All of the pastoral holdings separate leases were listed in the sale, Millungera , Tharwan , Savannah Downs , Kuradin , East Creek  and other smaller leases.
 
In 1933 an experiment was conducted to introduce Zebu cattle into the herd to make the English bred stock would give them resistance to tropical diseases and cope better with the tropical conditions. The station was still owned by Meredith Menzies Pty Ltd at this time.
  
In 1950 a stockman, Alan Doyle, went missing in the heavily timbered Savannah portion of the holding prompting a search party to be sent out. Doyle was the third person that had gone missing at Millungera in a period of five weeks. Doyle was found a week later after feeding himself on boiled grass and goanna.

CSR Limited auctioned off the property, which the Actons bought for 7 million in 1985 with its 26,000 head of cattle.

See also
List of ranches and stations
List of the largest stations in Australia

References

Stations (Australian agriculture)
Pastoral leases in Queensland
North West Queensland
1864 establishments in Australia